WRKY-FM (104.9 MHz) is a classic rock formatted broadcast radio station licensed to Hollidaysburg, Pennsylvania, serving Altoona, Pennsylvania.  WRKY-FM is owned and operated by Seven Mountains Media.

References

External links
 Rocky 104-9 Online
 

1978 establishments in Pennsylvania
Active rock radio stations in the United States
Radio stations established in 1978
RKY-FM